Mushabib al-Hamlan was an original candidate for the September 11 attacks. He became involved with militancy in December 1999 at secondary school, when he attended gatherings to watch videos about the glory of Jihad and detailing the atrocities of the Soviet invasion of Afghanistan and the Yugoslav wars. The group studied under Ban-dar Marui and read the book Gladiator of Passion.

The Hajj and Pakistan
On February 15, 2000, Hamlan received a passport and after completing the Hajj, went to Sharjah, UAE, to obtain a visa to enter Pakistan. Once in Islamabad, Pakistan, he and two co-travelers were led by Hassan Ghul to a waypoint controlled by Abu Zubaydah. By March, they had crossed the border into Afghanistan where he attended the Al Khaldan training camp. When the camp was closed, he moved with its other members to Al-Farouq outside Kandahar, where he met Osama bin Laden. After injuring himself at the camp, Hamlan was assigned to guard Kandahar Airport, a task that the eventual hijackers Saeed al-Ghamdi and Waleed al-Shehri shared.

Potential martyrs
During his time at Al-Farooq and the airport, Hamlan is thought to have befriended Ahmed al-Nami. The two of them studied under Abu Basir al-Yemeni, who coaxed them to enlist with Abu Hafs al Mauritani as potential 'martyrs' who would carry out suicide missions inside the United States.

Hamlan and Nami were sent to meet bin Laden, identifying themselves through the phrase "I want to be one of this religion's bricks and glorify this religion". In October 2000, Hamlan and Nami met with Khalid Shaikh Mohammed who instructed them on encrypting telephone calls. They also had their passports falsified to suggest that they were world travelers visiting locations such as Singapore, Malaysia, Egypt and Turkey. After a meeting with Muhammad Atef, they flew to Tehran, Iran, onward to Qatar and back into the UAE before arriving in Mecca, Saudi Arabia. On instructions from Khalid Shaikh Mohammed, they drove to Jeddah, where they stayed with the future hijacker Waleed al-Shehri. He instructed them how to obtain US visas, which both received on October 28.

Return to family
Hamlan did not use his visa. Immediately after they were issued their visas, Hamlan phoned his family and learned that his mother was ill. He decided not to pursue martyrdom and returned to his family. Khalid al Zahrani, an associate from Al-Farouq, visited him later to try to convince him to return, but failed.

References

Al-Qaeda members
Living people
People associated with the September 11 attacks
Year of birth missing (living people)